Sam Garvin (born 1964) is an American business executive and administrator who is the current CEO of the Garvin Promotion Group and former alternate and incumbent governor of the Phoenix Suns from September 15, 2022 until February 7, 2023, replacing Robert Sarver for what was intended to be the entire 2022-23 NBA season until the sale of the Suns to Mat Ishbia and Justin Ishbia on February 7, 2023 became official.

Biography

Early life and education
Sam Garvin was born in Pittsburgh, Pennsylvania. He was educated at the University of Pittsburgh, where he earned a Bachelor of Arts degree in political science and German studies. Later, he studied at the Thunderbird School and graduated in 1988.

Career
During Ronald Reagan's administration, Garvin worked as a staff assistant in the White House.

In 2004, Garvin gave $60 million to Thunderbird School of Global Management as a donation, and later, the school was renamed after him from 2004 until 2007 as Thunderbird, the Garvin School of International Management. He also acquired a stake in the Phoenix Suns NBA organization during the same year. From 2007 until 2022, he's also served as an alternate governor of the team. Additionally, between 2004 and 2010, he was a member of Suns Chariites Board.

On September 15, 2022, it was announced that Garvin would become the interim team governor of the Phoenix Suns, replacing Robert Sarver's position there for the majority of the 2022–23 NBA season. Previously, he has served as the vice-chairman of the Phoenix Suns. His first major move as acting team governor was promoting James Jones from general manager to President of Basketball Operations on November 20, 2022. He then approved of point guard Saben Lee (previously a part of the Suns' preseason team in that same season) signing multiple 10-day contracts on January 11 & 21, 2023, before signing him to a two-way contract and waiving Duane Washington Jr. on February 1, 2023. In what became his final announcement as interim team governor, Garvin announced via e-mail that Suns team president and CEO Jason Rowley (who was with the team's front office since 2007 and held his positions in question since 2012, as well as previously held the general manager position for the Phoenix Mercury) resigned from his position with the team on February 6, 2023.

On February 7, 2023, the ownership of Phoenix Suns and Phoenix Mercury franchises were transferred to a group led by Mat Ishbia and his older brother Justin Ishbia, with the minority ownership maintained by Sam Garvin. He is also the current Vice Chairman and NBA Alternate Governor of the Phoenix Suns.

Recognition
Governor's Spirit of Success (1999)
Thunderbird School of Global Management was renamed after his contributions to the school. (2004-2007)

References

1964 births
Living people
National Basketball Association executives
Phoenix Suns executives
Phoenix Suns owners
People from Pittsburgh
Reagan administration personnel
Thunderbird School of Global Management alumni
University of Pittsburgh alumni